Marthand K. Venkatesh is an Indian film editor who mostly works for Telugu films, and is the winner of four Nandi Awards.

Life and career
Venkatesh is son of noted Telugu film editor K. A. Marthand. He used to assist his father in editing for the films produced by Suresh Productions. Telugu film director K. Raghavendra Rao gave him the first independent charge of editing his Allari Premikudu in 1994. With the success of his films in the maiden year like Preminchukundam Raa, Bavagaru Bagunnara! and Tholi Prema. He lost his father the same year and was guided by Raghvendra Rao. He has many hit films for his credit during the last two decades. They include Daddy (2001), Kalisundam Raa, Leader (2010 film), Happy Days (2007 film), Arya (2004 film), Anand (2004), Bommarillu and Pokiri (2006),Arundhati (2009 film) and more. He is a prominent editor in the Telugu film industry.

Awards

Awards
Nandi Awards
 Best Editor - Tholi Prema (1998)
 Best Editor - Daddy (2001)
 Best Editor - Pokiri (2006)
 Best Editor - Arundhati'' (2008)

Filmography

References

External links
 

Living people
Telugu people
Nandi Award winners
Tamil film editors
Telugu film editors
Film editors from Andhra Pradesh
Year of birth missing (living people)
Place of birth missing (living people)